The 1963 U.S. Figure Skating Championships was held at the Long Beach Arena in Long Beach, California from January 7–10, 1963. Medals were awarded in three colors: gold (first), silver (second), and bronze (third) in four disciplines – men's singles, ladies singles, pair skating, and ice dancing – across three levels: senior, junior, and novice (singles only).

The event determined the U.S. team for the 1963 World Championships.

Senior results

Men
Thomas Litz put on a "truly magnificent" performance, receiving the only standing ovation of the three days of competition.  He performed one of the most difficult jumping routines ever seen in an American championship meet.  His stunning performance, which had the crowd of about 2400 calling for more, unseated the defending champion Monty Hoyt, who finished third. Litz, the 1962 junior champion, finished third in the compulsory figures  before winning the free with two triple jumps. Litz told reporters "When I heard that applause I wanted to run up into the stands and shake hands with everyone in the place.  I'm sure glad I picked tonight to do my best ever."

Ladies
Lorraine Hanlon won the compulsory figures, followed by Karen Howland.

Pairs
Siblings Judianne Fotheringill / Jerry Fotheringill won their first title.  Defending champion with a previous partner, Pieter Kollen finished third with new partner Patti Gustafson. Previous partner Dorothyann Nelson retired from competition last year to skate with the Ice Follies.

Ice dancing (Gold dance)
Sally Schantz / Stanley Urban were the new champions.

Junior results

Men
(incomplete standings)

Ladies
Though she finished last in the field of 10, 18-year old Maidie Sullivan from Colorado Springs made skating history when she became the first to successfully complete a triple jump in US ladies competition.

Pairs

Ice dancing (Silver dance)

Novice results

Men

Ladies

References

U.S. Figure Skating Championships
United States Figure Skating Championships, 1963
United States Figure Skating Championships, 1963
January 1963 sports events in the United States